Azzam was a Volvo Open 70 yacht by Farr Yacht Design. She finished fifth in the 2011–12 Volvo Ocean Race skippered by Ian Walker.

On the 16th of January, 2015 the yacht was completely destroyed by fire in France.

See also
Azzam (2014 yacht)

References

Volvo Ocean Race yachts
Volvo Open 70 yachts
Sailing yachts of the United Arab Emirates
Sailing yachts designed by Farr Yacht Design